Princess Zorka of Montenegro (Serbian Cyrillic: Кнегиња црногорска Зорка; 23 December [O.S. 11 December] 1864 – 16 March [O.S. 4 March] 1890) was the eldest child of the Montenegrin monarch Nicholas I and his wife Milena. Her name and title at birth was Ljubica Petrović-Njegoš, Princess of Montenegro.

In 1883, she married prince Peter Karađorđević and she changed her name to Zorka (and her surname to Karađorđević). She died in childbirth while giving birth to Prince Andrija on 16 March 1890. Prince Andrija died shortly thereafter.

Her husband Prince Peter went on to become King of Serbia in 1903, thirteen years after her death.

Life
Born in Cetinje, Montenegro at the time when her father was already the reigning Prince of Montenegro (his uncle Danilo II Petrović-Njegoš having died in 1860). She had eight younger sisters and three younger brothers. Zorka was educated in Russia before returning to Montenegro to be engaged to Petar Karađorđević. She spent her childhood up to the age of 11 in Cetinje, where she was educated by Cetinje teachers and a Swiss teacher Mrs. Nykom. In 1875, Princess Zorka was sent to Russia to continue her education at the Smolny Institute (attended by the girls from the most prominent Russian aristocratic families). After graduation, she returned to Cetinje. At the beginning of 1883, Prince Petar Karadjordjevic came to Cetinje. His intention was to marry in Cetinje, get closer to the Montenegrins and move there to live with his family. He asked for the hand of the young and beautiful Princess. The arrival of Petar Karadjordjevic in Cetinje and his engagement with Kneginja Zorka Petrovic-Njegos were disapproved by the opponents of these two dynasties, but the act was gladly accepted by the Serbian and Montenegrin people, who saw it as the confirmation of their future bond. The wedding of Princess Zorka (19 at the time) and Petar Karadjordjevic (39) took place at the Cetinje Monastery on 30 July 1883. The wedding party, like the engagement before it, was organized according to folk tradition, with many guests who could barely accommodate themselves in the small space of Cetinje.

Zorka's sister Elena married the future King Victor Emmanuel III of Italy.

Marriage and children
Described as "exuberant" by one commentator, Zorka married Peter in Cetinje on 11 August 1883 in an Orthodox ceremony.

They had five children:
 Princess Helen of Serbia (4 November 1884 – 16 October 1962).
 Princess Milena of Serbia (28 April 1886 – 21 December 1887).
 George, Crown Prince of Serbia (8 September 1887 – 17 October 1972).
 Alexander I of Yugoslavia (16 December 1888 – 9 October 1934).
 Prince Andrew of Serbia (born and died 16 March 1890).

Death
Zorka died aged just 25 on 16 March 1890 in Cetinje during childbirth and was buried in the St. George's Church in Topola, Serbia.

Monument
The first monument for a woman in Serbia was erected for Zorka on 3 June 1926. The monument, a work of sculptor Stamenko Đurđević, was funded by the Duchess Zorka Society and was located on the Big Kalemegdan. The monument was removed and probably destroyed after World War II. The gypsum model of the monument has survived and is housed in the History Museum of Serbia.

References

External links
 Royal Mausoleum Oplenac
 The Njegoskij Fund Public Project : Private family archives-based digital documentary fund focused on history and culture of Royal Montenegro.

1864 births
1890 deaths
People from Cetinje
Serbs of Montenegro
Serbian royal consorts
Petrović-Njegoš dynasty
Karađorđević dynasty
Montenegrin princesses
19th-century Serbian women
Deaths in childbirth
Burials at the Mausoleum of the Royal House of Karađorđević, Oplenac
Daughters of kings